A Gentleman Roughneck is a 1925 American silent action film directed by Grover Jones and starring Frank Merrill, Virginia Warwick and  Jack Richardson. The plot revolves around corruption in a lumber camp.

Cast
 Frank Merrill
 Virginia Warwick		
 William Conklin	
 Jack Richardson
 Murdock MacQuarrie  	
 William T. Hayes
 Eddie Boland

References

Bibliography
 Connelly, Robert B. The Silents: Silent Feature Films, 1910-36, Volume 40, Issue 2. December Press, 1998.
 Munden, Kenneth White. The American Film Institute Catalog of Motion Pictures Produced in the United States, Part 1. University of California Press, 1997.

External links
 

1925 films
1920s action films
American silent feature films
American action films
American black-and-white films
Films directed by Grover Jones
1920s English-language films
1920s American films
Silent action films